Michel Vlap (born 2 June 1997) is a Dutch professional footballer who plays as a midfielder for Twente. He has represented the Netherlands internationally at various youth levels. Though his preferred position is in an advanced midfield role, Vlap is also able to play on the wing and as a forward.

Club career

Heerenveen
Vlap is an academy graduate of Eredivisie side Heerenveen and is the son of academy coach and former player Jan Vlap. Having progressed through the ranks of Heerenveen's youth academy, he signed his first professional contract on 17 February 2015, penning a three-year deal with the club. He later featured for Heerenveen during the 2015–16 pre-season and scored a brace in the club's 8–1 victory over VV Heerenveen in new manager Jurgen Streppel's first match in charge of the club. Vlap then made his senior debut for the club on 27 November 2016, coming on as a late, second-half substitute for Kosovar international Arber Zeneli in a 1–0 Eredivisie loss to Ajax.

Vlap failed to appear again during the 2016–17 season but returned to the first team to make his KNVB Cup debut on 20 September 2017, coming on as a substitute in a 2–1 win over Excelsior. He scored his first goal for the club the following month, netting in a 2–1 defeat to AZ Alkmaar. On 3 December, he signed a new five-year contract with Heerenveen after impressing with a run of three goals in his previous five appearances for the club. He ultimately scored four goals in 26 appearances across all competitions for the campaign.

He continued to feature for the club the following season and in October 2018, after scoring a league-high four goals in the month, won the Eredevise Player of the Month award. By the end of the campaign, he had scored 16 goals and recorded six assists which earned him a transfer to Belgian side, Anderlecht.

Anderlecht and loans
In February 2021, Vlap moved to Bundesliga team Arminia Bielefeld from Anderlecht, on a loan deal until the end of the season. On 15 February, Vlap scored his first Bundesliga goal in the ninth minute of his debut, in a 3-3 away draw at Bayern Munich.

Twente
Vlap again moved on loan in August 2021, returning to the Eredivisie with Twente. On 4 July 2022, Anderlecht and Twente agreed on a permanent transfer and Vlap signed a three-year contract.

International career

Netherlands national youth teams
Vlap has represented Netherlands at both under-18 and under-19 level. On 21 July 2016, while representing the Netherlands at the UEFA European Under-19 Championship, Vlap made history by becoming the first player ever to be brought on as a fourth substitute in a UEFA match when he replaced Laros Duarte in a 3–3 (5–4) penalty shoot-out loss to Germany. Regulations ordinarily allow a team to make three substitutions during a match but a trial allowing for a fourth substitution in extra-time was introduced by the International Football Association Board for the tournament.

Career statistics

Honours
Individual
Eredivisie Talent of the Month: October 2018

References

External links
 

1997 births
Living people
People from Sneek
Dutch footballers
Association football midfielders
Netherlands youth international footballers
Netherlands under-21 international footballers
Footballers from Friesland
Eredivisie players
Belgian Pro League players
Bundesliga players
SC Heerenveen players
R.S.C. Anderlecht players
Arminia Bielefeld players
FC Twente players
Dutch expatriate footballers
Dutch expatriate sportspeople in Belgium
Expatriate footballers in Belgium
Dutch expatriate sportspeople in Germany
Expatriate footballers in Germany